Walter Giffard, Lord of Longueville in Normandy, 1st Earl of Buckingham (died 1102) was an Anglo-Norman magnate.

He was the son of Walter Giffard, Lord of Longueville (one of the few proven companions of William the Conqueror at the Battle of Hastings in 1066)  and Ermengarde daughter of Gerald Flaitel. His father had been given 107 lordships, 48 of which were in Buckinghamshire which Giffard inherited by 1085. The caput of his feudal honor was at Crendon, Buckinghamshire.

He held an important castle at Longueville overlooking the River Scie as well as vast estates in Buckinghamshire. As he held lands in both England and Normandy he was a vassal to both Robert Curthose and William Rufus. But Rufus purchased his loyalty along with several other key cross-Channel barons and fortified Giffard's and the other castles, garrisoning them with knights in the king's employ who could now ravage northeastern Normandy. Giffard also served Rufus as Justiciar of England, and it was probably Rufus who created him Earl of Buckingham in 1097. Giffard was one of the great magnates who joined Robert Curthose's 1101 invasion of England against Henry I of England. He died 15 July 1102 in England and his body was returned to Normandy, where it was interred at St. Mary's Church at Longueville-sur-Scie, the caput of his Norman honors.

Giffard was married to Agnes de Ribemont, sister of Anselm de Ribemont. His heir was his son,  Walter Giffard, 2nd Earl of Buckingham.

Notes

References

Sources
William M. Aird, Robert Curthose Duke of Normandy (Woodbridge: The Boydell Press, 2008)
George Edward Cokayne, The Complete Peerage of England Scotland Ireland Great Britain and the United Kingdom, Extant Extinct or Dormant, Vol. II, Ed. Vicary Gibbs (London: The St. Catherine Press, Ltd., 1912)

11th-century births
1102 deaths
11th-century English nobility
12th-century English nobility
01
Anglo-Normans
Year of birth unknown